Giovanni Stefano Ferrero (1474–1510) (called the Cardinal of Bologna) was an Italian Roman Catholic bishop and cardinal.

Biography

Giovanni Stefano Ferrero was born in Biella on May 5, 1474, the son of Sebastiano Ferrero and Tomena Avogadro. The Ferrero family was allied with the Acciaioli family, one of the most prominent families in the Republic of Florence.  Gianstefano Ferrero's younger brother Bonifacio Ferrero also became a cardinal.

Ferrero studied canon law at the University of Padua.  He then moved to Rome and became an Auditor of the Roman Rota.  He next became a protonotary apostolic.

At the insistence of Blanche of Montferrat (regent for her son Charles II, Duke of Savoy), Ferrero was named coadjutor bishop of Vercelli on April 24, 1493.  He succeeded as Bishop of Vercelli on July 16, 1499, occupying the see until January 21, 1502.  He occupied the see again from October 31, 1503 until November 5, 1509, when he exchanged it with his brother Bonifacio Ferrero.

Pope Alexander VI made him a cardinal priest in pectore in the consistory of September 28, 1500.  He was transferred to the see of Bologna on January 24, 1502; he occupied this see until his death.  His creation as cardinal was published on June 28, 1502 and the same day he received the red hat and the titular church of San Vitale.

He participated in both the papal conclave of September 1503 that elected Pope Pius III and the papal conclave of October 1503 that elected Pope Julius II.

On December 22, 1505, he exchanged his titulus for Santi Sergio e Bacco, a deaconry raised pro illa vice to the status of titulus.

He was Camerlengo of the Sacred College of Cardinals from January 1506 until 1507.

On November 5, 1509, he exchanged his bishopric with his brother Bonifacio, becoming apostolic administrator of the see of Ivrea; he subsequently occupied this see until his death.

He died in Rome on October 5, 1510.  He was initially buried in the Basilica di San Clemente.  His remains were later transferred to Biella and buried in the church of San Sebastiano, a church of the Canons Regular of the Lateran.

References

1474 births
1510 deaths
16th-century Italian cardinals
Cardinals created by Pope Alexander VI
16th-century Italian Roman Catholic bishops
People from Biella